Diamond Lake School District 76 is a PK-8 school district centered on the village of Mundelein, Illinois, which is located in central Lake County. The district mainly feeds into Mundelein High School in Mundelein, Illinois with some students feeding into Adlai E. Stevenson High School in Lincolnshire, Illinois after the eighth grade. The Mundelein district is composed of three schools: two elementary schools and one middle school. The first elementary school, Fairhaven School, educates those in the first grade and kindergarten and also upholds a prekindergarten program; the principal of the school is Michele Allen. Fairhaven School students move on to attend Diamond Lake Elementary School in the grades succeeding first before feeding into the district middle school after fourth grade; the principal is Kurt Pebble, and the mascot of the school is the dolphin. The school that educates the eldest of the district students is called West Oak Middle School, serving grades five through eight. The principal of West Oak is Christopher Willeford, while the mascots are the Spirits.

West Oak Middle School runs a choir program and a band program; the school also runs a specialized band program called the "Spirit Jazz."

References

External links

Fairhaven School Website Main Page
Diamond Lake Elementary School Website Main Page
West Oak Middle School Main Page
GreatSchools.com Information on Diamond Lake School District 76, retrieved 2008-5-12

Lincolnshire, Illinois
Mundelein, Illinois
School districts in Lake County, Illinois